The following is a list of properties owned by Scentre Group, an Australian commercial real estate company with assets in Australia and New Zealand. Their portfolio includes a number of Westfield-branded shopping centres that were originally owned by Westfield Group, and spun-off into the Scentre Group in 2014.

Australia

Australian Capital Territory
 Westfield Belconnen
 Westfield Woden

New South Wales
 Westfield Bondi Junction
 Westfield Burwood
 Westfield Chatswood
 Westfield Eastgardens
 Westfield Hornsby
 Westfield Hurstville
 Westfield Kotara
 Westfield Liverpool
 Westfield Miranda
 Westfield Mount Druitt
 Westfield Parramatta
 Westfield Penrith
 Westfield Sydney
 Westfield Tuggerah
 Westfield Warringah Mall

South Australia
 Westfield Marion
 Westfield Tea Tree Plaza
 Westfield West Lakes

Victoria
 Westfield Airport West
 Westfield Doncaster
 Westfield Fountain Gate
 Westfield Geelong
 Westfield Knox
 Westfield Plenty Valley
 Westfield Southland

Queensland
 Westfield Carindale
 Westfield Chermside
 Westfield Mt Gravatt
 Westfield Helensvale
 Westfield North Lakes
 Westfield Coomera

Western Australia
 Westfield Booragoon
 Westfield Carousel
 Westfield Innaloo
 Westfield Whitford City

New Zealand
 Westfield Albany
 Westfield Manukau City
 Westfield Newmarket
 Westfield St Lukes
 Westfield Riccarton

See also
 List of shopping centres in Australia
 List of shopping centres in New Zealand

References

Scentre Group